Hinoi Henry (born 16 June 1981) in Cook Islands is a footballer who plays as a midfielder. He currently plays for Puaikura and the Cook Islands national football team.

References

1981 births
Living people
Cook Islands international footballers
Association football midfielders
Cook Island footballers
Puaikura FC players
2000 OFC Nations Cup players